Alexandros Karathodoros (Greek: Αλέξανδρος Καραθόδωρος, 1908 - 1981) was a Greek politician and minister. He was born in Trikala in 1908 to a Sarakatsani family. In 1920 his family moved near Polykastro, in village Latomi, Kilkis regional unit because it was closer to mount Vermio, where they were herding the sheep in summer. He studied law in the university of Athens. Elected as member of the parliament continuously from 1946 to 1967, he became Minister for Transport and Communications from 1950 to 1952 and Minister without Portfolio in 1966. He was imprisoned by the military junta in 1967. Karathodoros died in Athens in 1981.

See also
Politics of Greece
Greek politicians

1908 births
1981 deaths
People from Trikala
Sarakatsani
United Alignment of Nationalists politicians
People's Party (Greece) politicians
Greek Rally politicians
Progressive Party (Greece) politicians
Greek MPs 1946–1950
Greek MPs 1950–1951
Greek MPs 1951–1952
Greek MPs 1952–1956
Greek MPs 1956–1958
Greek MPs 1958–1961
Greek MPs 1961–1963
Greek MPs 1963–1964
Greek MPs 1964–1967
Greek prisoners and detainees